Mervi Pohjanheimo (born June 10, 1945, in Mäntyharju, Finland) is a Finnish and television director and producer. She has directed and produced TV entertainment shows for a Finnish television network called Oy Mainos-TV-Reklam Ab, later MTV3, since the late 1970s.

Filmography
Director
 Tupla tai kuitti (1972-1973) 
 Piikkis (1987) 
 Ilettääkö (1988)
 Levyraati (1988) 
 Enkelten keittiö (1989)
 Seppo Hovin seurassa (1990)
 Hecumania (1996)
 Tangomarkkinat (1999)
 Koivula ja tähdet (2000)
 MTV3 Live: Joulun tähti (2002)
 Aarresaaren sankarit (2003) 
Producer
 Hecumania (1996) 
 MTV3 Live: Joulun tähti (2002)

References

External links

1930 births
Living people
People from Mäntyharju
Finnish television directors